Bolbocephalus is a genus of proetid trilobites in the family Bathyuridae. Species lived during the early part of the Arenig stage of the Ordovician Period, a faunal stage which lasted from approximately 478 to 471 million years ago, in marine strata of the United States, Canada, and Greenland.

References

Proetida genera
Ordovician trilobites of North America
Paleozoic life of Newfoundland and Labrador
Paleozoic life of Nunavut
Paleozoic life of Quebec